John Quincy Adams Barbee (March 16, 1914 – January 14, 2000), nicknamed "Bud", was an American Negro league outfielder in the 1930s and 1940s.

A native of Durham, North Carolina, Barbee graduated from Whitted High School. A "prodigious power-hitter", he made his Negro leagues debut in 1937 for the New York Black Yankees. Barbee served in the United States Army during World War II, and returned from service to resume his baseball career. He was the brother of fellow Negro leaguer Lamb Barbee, and the brothers played together for the Cincinnati Clowns in 1945. Barbee died in Durham in 2000 at age 85.

References

External links
 and Seamheads 
 Quincy 'Bud' Barbee at Negro League Baseball Players Association

1914 births
2000 deaths
Baltimore Elite Giants players
Cincinnati Clowns players
New York Black Yankees players
Philadelphia Stars players
African Americans in World War II
United States Army personnel of World War II
Baseball outfielders
African-American United States Army personnel